The National Revolutionary Council was the body that ruled Sudan after the coup d'état in May 1969. It was disbanded in October 1971.

Initially Babiker Awadalla, a lawyer, served as Premier, but was then moved by Maj-Gen Gaafar Nimeiry to become deputy chair of the council on 26 November 1969. Joseph Garang, a southerner, was also on the council in its initial days.

Members (in 1970)

Chairman: Maj.-Gen. Gaafar Nimeiry
First Deputy Chairman: Mr. Babiker Awadalla
Members: Majs. Farouk Hamadallah, Khalid Hassan Abbas, Mamoun Awad, Abul Kassem Hashem, Muhammad Ahmed, Abul Kassem Ibrahim, Abu Bakr al-Nur and Hashem al Atta.

See also 
Egyptian Revolutionary Command Council
Libyan Revolutionary Command Council
Revolutionary Command Council (Iraq)

References

Government of Sudan
History of Sudan
Politics of Sudan
Military dictatorships